Karen McCarthy (March 18, 1947 – October 5, 2010) was an American educator and politician. She served as the U.S. representative for the fifth district of Missouri from 1995 to 2005.

Early life
McCarthy was born in Haverhill, Massachusetts and grew up in Leawood, Kansas, and graduated from Shawnee Mission East High School. She received a Bachelor of Science degree in Biology and English from the University of Kansas in 1969 and a Master of Arts in English Education from the University of Missouri–Kansas City in 1976. McCarthy later earned an M.B.A. at the University of Kansas. Prior to running for public office, McCarthy taught English at Shawnee Mission South High School and the Sunset Hill School.

Missouri state politics
First elected to the Missouri House of Representatives in 1976 as a Democrat, McCarthy was re-elected eight times, generally with little opposition. She became a ranking party member in the state House, serving on numerous committees including chairman of Ways and Means (1983-1995), and a member of the Appropriations and Energy committees. McCarthy also served as the first female president of the National Conference of State Legislatures in 1994.

House career
In 1994, Congressman Alan Wheat ran for the U.S. Senate, leaving an open seat. McCarthy won a crowded six-way primary, and then defeated Republican Ron Freeman with 56 percent of the vote.  She was easily reelected four more times. McCarthy served on the Energy and Commerce committee (subcommittees: Commerce, Trade and Consumer Protection, Energy and Air Quality, Telecommunications and Internet and Environment and Hazardous Materials) and the Select Committee on Homeland Security as the ranking Democrat on the Intelligence and Counterterrorism subcommittee.

McCarthy announced in 2003 that she wouldn't run for a sixth term in 2004 after revealing that she suffered from alcoholism. A widely reported incident in which an intoxicated McCarthy fell down inside a House office building forced her to admit her problem and seek treatment.

Selected honors include the Missouri Citizens for the Arts 2005 Advocacy Award and the Business and Professional Women of the USA's Woman of the Year award.

Global climate change activities
McCarthy served as co-chair of the Missouri Commission of Global Climate Change, an extensive two-year (1989–1991) study of scientific data to develop environmental and economic policy options for state action. She was also a congressional representative to the Kyoto Protocol on global climate change and a Harvard fellow at the Institute of Politics at the John F. Kennedy School of Government "The Politics of Alternative Energies", in the fall of 1982.

Post-congressional activities and death
In December 2003, McCarthy announced that she wouldn't seek another term in the House. She was succeeded by Emanuel Cleaver, a fellow Democrat. McCarthy returned to Kansas City, Missouri where she sat on a number of boards and was an active fundraiser and sponsor for a variety of cultural and political activities.

In June 2009, her family revealed that McCarthy was suffering from an advanced form of Alzheimer's disease and was residing in a nursing home. Their statement said her difficulties were compounded by a bipolar disorder that apparently went undiagnosed for at least a decade. A non-injury car accident involving McCarthy at her home in April prompted her friends to seek medical help which revealed her illnesses.

McCarthy died on October 5, 2010, at age 63.

Electoral history

Write-in and minor candidate notes:  In 2000, Reform candidate Dennis M. Carriger received 974 votes.

See also
 Women in the United States House of Representatives

References

External links

 

|-

|-

|-

1947 births
2010 deaths
Politicians from Haverhill, Massachusetts
Deaths from Alzheimer's disease
Neurological disease deaths in Kansas
Harvard Kennedy School people
People from Leawood, Kansas
Politicians from Kansas City, Missouri
University of Kansas alumni
University of Missouri–Kansas City alumni
Female members of the United States House of Representatives
Democratic Party members of the Missouri House of Representatives
Women state legislators in Missouri
Democratic Party members of the United States House of Representatives from Missouri
20th-century American politicians
20th-century American women politicians
21st-century American politicians
21st-century American women politicians
People with bipolar disorder